Dikir barat (Jawi: دكير بارت;) is a musical form, native to the Malay Peninsula, that involves singing in groups—often in a competitive setting. Dikir barat may be performed either with a percussion instrumental accompaniment, or with no instruments at all.

Description
 is typically performed by groups of ten to fifteen members, though there is no actual set size, even in competitive environments. A group usually sits cross-legged on a platform, sometimes surrounded by the audience.

In a typical  performance, the group will perform two segments. Though musically more complex than what will follow, the first segment is seen as the "low-key" segment of the performance.

The  (who is often himself a former ) is expected in his performance to utilise current social and political issues which will be relevant to the audience. His ability to do this helps to uphold the reputation of the  group. Leading the  during the second and concluding segment of the performance, the  sings —most of which are likely original and improvised on the occasion of the performance, but some which may be known to the audience. That the  uses  does not mean that it is a performance of poetry. The tone can be satirical, sarcastic, or simply humorous, but above all it is expected that it be clever. The  makes up and sings lyrics on the topic of the performance (which may be pre-established or simply the choice of the ), and the  sings the same lyrics back to him. During the performance, members of the  clap and perform rhythmic body movements, which bring energy to the performance.

Historically, dikir barat performances have been all-male. However, in recent years, especially with groups based in urban areas, female performers are beginning to appear.

Competition
In a competitive performance, the two opposing dikir barat groups both sit on the stage platform at the same time. The performance is as musical as a non-competitive performance, but the competitive  is also, according to one observer, “a duel of wits”. At this time the opposing  group's  must reply with an answer more clever than the original question, and after the second  sings it back, the first  must take the dialogue another step higher. Essentially, what transpires is a type of lyrical debate, but instead of scoring technical debate points,  who regularly produce well-created retorts will win audience laughter, affection, and admiration.

Originally,  was limited to competition between neighbouring villages, but in the 20th century, as its popularity began to spread (aided by the ability to record performances), it became a national phenomenon. Top  are famous and popular, much like rock stars in the West.

The government of Malaysia now officially sponsors  as a major element of national culture, and has experienced substantial success in spreading its popularity. To facilitate its spread, in 2006, then-Minister of Information Datuk Seri Zainuddin Maidin said he would encourage the development of English language , as English is the most widely spoken second-language in the former British colony, and could thus be shared by more citizens.  The national competitions in Malaysia have been broadcast on radio since 1993, and on television since 2006.

Spread of

Origins
Sources are divided on whether  originated in southern Thailand or the Malaysian state of Kelantan, which borders Thailand, or even from a wedding dance shared by both the Thai Malays and the Kelantanese Malay.

Today,  has spread to the end of the Malay Peninsula, having reached Singapore, by some accounts, in the mid-1980s,  where it is also being promoted by at least one government agency.

Dikir barat in the West
In recent years, Dikir barat performances have spread to the West, most commonly on university campuses.
 In 2007, a Malaysian student organisation at Penn State University, in the United States, included a  performance as part of a traditional Malaysian wedding being held on campus.
 The Malaysian Student Organisation of the University of Illinois also performed a dikir barat for the Malaysian Cultural Exhibition organised at the university.
 The Malaysian Society of Imperial College London, performs a dikir barat annually on its Malaysian Night organised by the university.
 The Malaysian Students Association (MSA) of The University of Warwick performs this art form on its Malaysian Night (MNight) every year.
 The Malaysian Students' Organisation of the Australian National University performs this performance on its Malaysian Night 2014 with Malaysian Student Council of Australia, Australian Capital Territory (ACT Chapter) and Kelab UMNO ACT.

In popular culture
 One of the TV advertisements for the then upcoming Malaysian Idol had the instance of a battle of hawking trades in a pasar malam between a mango seller and an orange seller, where the former raps about his mangoes in English and the latter flaunts off his oranges in a singing manner similar to that of dikir barat.
 In the Malaysian video game No Straight Roads (released in 2020), one of the bosses is named "DK West", a pun on the name of Dikir Barat, and the music played during the fight is described as a rap battle between the main characters and DK West which plays with a crowd of faceless individuals sitting near DK West and clapping in rhythm. To add to the music, the game also makes use during this segment of Wayang Kulit.

References

External links
 An excellent example of dikir barat, showing audience reaction to humour

Malay dances
Malay culture
Malaysian styles of music
Dances of Malaysia